Jake Kaufman (born 1981; also known as virt or virtjk) is an American video game music composer. After starting out creating arrangements and remixes of video game soundtracks, he began his commercial composing career in 2000 with the score to the Game Boy Color port of Q*bert. He continued to compose music for games for the next couple of years, working primarily with handheld video games. In 2002, he set up the website VGMix, which hosts video game music remixes, and continues to administrate it. His career began to take off over the next few years, resulting in him transitioning jobs into a full-time freelance composer by 2005. Since then he has worked on several big-name projects such as the Shantae series, Contra 4, Red Faction: Guerrilla, DuckTales: Remastered, Shovel Knight, and Crypt of the Necrodancer.

Biography 
Kaufman dropped out of high school with what he describes as "a total lack of work ethic and no concept of timeliness or organization." He spent the next few years composing arrangements and remixes of video game music under the alias "virt". In 2000, Kaufman broke into the video game industry as a composer, with his first work being the Game Boy Color port of Q*bert. Over the next few years, he composed the music to several Game Boy Color and Game Boy Advance games. In 2002, Kaufman was one of the co-founders of the website VGMix, which hosted video game music remixes.

During 2002–2005, Kaufman's career as a video game music composer began to take off. By 2005, he was a full-time freelance video game composer. He continued to compose music to increasingly big-name projects, such as Contra 4 and TMNT in 2007 and Red Faction: Guerrilla in 2009; he described composing the soundtrack to a Contra game and a Teenage Mutant Ninja Turtles game as his "lifelong dream". Kaufman contributed a track to the official arranged album of music from Ketsui: Kizuna Jigoku Tachi. He was a full-time employee of Volition while working on Red Faction, but in January 2010, he left the company to become the "lead audio guy" for WayForward, for which he had already composed several soundtracks such as those of Shantae and Contra 4. For WayForward he first composed the soundtrack to Shantae: Risky's Revenge, the sequel to the game he worked on ten years prior. Original Sound Version named Kaufman their Composer of the Year for 2011, based on his work on BloodRayne: Betrayal and Mighty Switch Force, as well as several other soundtracks and arranged albums. Kaufman lives with his puggle Nugget in northern Los Angeles.

While working at WayForward, Kaufman composed music for the Shantae series, the BloodRayne series, and nearly a dozen other games. During this time he also composed music for independent games such as Shovel Knight. On November 1, 2014, Kaufman announced that he was leaving WayForward on mutual terms to work as a freelance composer and sound designer from his own studio, in order to be able to set his own schedule and choose his own projects. The last games which he worked full-time for the company were Teenage Mutant Ninja Turtles: Danger of the Ooze and Shantae: Half-Genie Hero, the latter being composed between 2013 and 2015 but only released in late 2016.

In February 2015, Kaufman collaborated with Jessie Seely, a video game vocalist and professional artist, to launch the Kickstarter campaign of [NUREN] The New Renaissance. [NUREN] was self-described as "the world's first virtual reality rock opera." The project was planned to be a full-length music album, accompanied by music videos that users would experience using a head-mounted display such as the Oculus Rift. The proposed music and videos were set in a post-war future society where androids cater to humanity's needs; two prototype androids named QGK and RIX were planned as the main subjects of the project. In March 2015, the project was successfully funded with $76,950 raised. The project was slated to arrive to Kickstarter backers in February 2016. In August 2016, Kaufman cited "contracting work" and a "ridiculous client workload" as obstacles to completing [NUREN], and as of 2022 it has yet to be released.

In March 2016, Kaufman and recording engineer Robert Altschuler founded their own music label called Mint Potion, based in Santa Clarita, California. It provides music and audio services for a variety of productions, most notably the background music and theme songs for the TV shows OK K.O.! Let's Be Heroes and Mao Mao: Heroes of Pure Heart. Through Mint Potion, Kaufman briefly worked again with WayForward as a freelance composer on the games Cat Girl Without Salad: Amuse-Bouche and Vitamin Connection, as well as continued composing for the various Shovel Knight DLCs. Other composers such as Chiyoko Yamasato and Tommy Pedrini have since joined the label.

Works

Video games

Film

Television

Other work

References

External links 
 
 
 

21st-century American composers
21st-century American male musicians
American male composers
Chiptune musicians
Living people
American sound designers
Tracker musicians
Video game composers
1981 births